Tamás Kovács (born 5 November 1978) is a Hungarian judoka.

Achievements

See also
European Judo Championships
History of martial arts
Judo in Hungary
List of judo techniques
List of judoka
Martial arts timeline

References

External links

Hungarian male judoka
1978 births
Living people
Place of birth missing (living people)